Burner's Heath and Swallows Pond is a   nature reserve in Pirbright in Surrey. It is owned by Surrey County Council and managed by the Surrey Wildlife Trust.

This site is mainly woodland. It is a conifer plantation with areas of broadleaf trees, heath and acid grassland.

There is access from the A324 and B3032 roads.

References

Surrey Wildlife Trust